Dahlke is a German surname. Notable people with the surname include:
 Hermann Dahlke (1917–1943), German Waffen SS untersturmführer
 Jerry Dahlke (1929–2006), American baseball pitcher
 Kurt Dahlke (born 1958) aka Pyrolator, German musician and producer
 Paul Dahlke (actor) (1904–1984), German stage and film actor
 Paul Dahlke (Buddhist) (1865–1928), German physician and Buddhist

German-language surnames